Dilshod Yuldashev (born 29 January 1976) is a Uzbekistani boxer. He competed in the men's light flyweight event at the 2000 Summer Olympics.

References

1976 births
Living people
Uzbekistani male boxers
Olympic boxers of Uzbekistan
Boxers at the 2000 Summer Olympics
Place of birth missing (living people)
Light-flyweight boxers
21st-century Uzbekistani people